Poly (ADP-ribose) glycohydrolase is an enzyme that in humans is encoded by the PARG gene.

Poly (ADP-ribose) glycohydrolase (PARG) is the major enzyme responsible for the catabolism of poly (ADP-ribose), a reversible covalent-modifier of chromosomal proteins.  The protein is found in many tissues and may be subject to proteolysis generating smaller, active products.

References

Further reading 
 

EC 3.2.1